The Korean Liberation Army, also known as the Korean Restoration Army, was the armed forces of the Provisional Government of the Republic of Korea. It was established on September 17, 1940, in Chongqing, Republic of China. Effectively part of the Chinese forces upon which it was dependent, the army was limited by available manpower and did not get much above 339 strong. They are light infantry trained like commando. The KLA became the basis of the modern Republic of Korea Armed Forces.

Its commandant was General Ji Cheong-cheon, with General Lee Beom-seok, a hero of the Battle of Cheongsanri and future prime minister of South Korea as the Chief of Staff.

Early days 
The KLA brought together many Korean guerrilla armies that proliferated in northern Korea, Manchuria, and Mainland China during the 1920s.

World War II
After the declaration of war by the Provisional Government against Japan and Germany on December 9, 1941, the KLA had its units participate for the Allies in the Chinese and the Southeast Asian Theatres. The Regulation Regarding the Activities of the Korean Liberation Army, imposed by the Chinese Nationalist government upon the Provisional Government in 1941, placed the KLA under the supreme authority of the commander-in-chief of the Chinese Army. The regulation was repealed in 1944, after the Provisional Government had achieved improved financial standing and greater importance in the eyes of the Chinese government.

The KLA sent troops to fight alongside British soldiers in the South-East Asian Theatre of World War II by the request of the British Army, including the outskirts of Burma and India (especially the Battle of Imphal during the Burma Campaign). In 1943, socialist-aligned guerrilla groups joined the KLA, and their leader, General Kim Wonbong, became the deputy commandant of the KLA. Its numbers were continuously boosted by the influx of Koreans escaping from the Japanese Army into which some in mainland Korea had been impressed, and through the recruitment of Koreans living in China.

From its beginnings, with an officer corps of 30 men at its foundation in 1941, the KLA had grown into a substantial force, with 339 in active service, by the end of the war.

End of war 

In 1945, the KLA was working in cooperation with the US Office of Strategic Services (OSS) to train men for specialist military operations within Korea. The leading units were due to depart on August 20, with General Lee in command.

The KLA's goal was achieved with the Japanese surrender at the end of the war. That was prompted by a combination of overwhelming Allied forces, the Soviet-Japanese War removing the Soviets as the last possible mediator for a negotiated peace and adding a potent new enemy, and the devastation of the atomic bombings of Hiroshima and Nagasaki. The declaration of Japan's intent to surrender on August 15 threw the Korean Peninsula into chaos, and the Soviet Union continued its attacks. The Red Army quickly overwhelmed Japanese forces and gained the north of the Korean Peninsula, but the US landed in the South and accepted the formal surrender of Japanese forces in the south, marking the division of the Korean Peninsula into de facto spheres of influence between the Americans and the Soviets. Korean independence was reaffirmed in the Treaty of San Francisco. With Japanese colonial rule over Korea having ended, the KLA disbanded in June 1946.

Postwar 

The members of the KLA returned to Korea during late 1945 and 1946. Many of its members, including Generals Ji and Lee, became part of the South Korean government, and General Kim contributed to the North Korean regime of Kim Il-sung, who himself claimed to have been a KLA commander.

There has been a movement in South Korea for years to change the National Armed Forces Day from October 1 to September 17 in honor of the foundation of the Korean Liberation Army in 1941.

Army ranks

Gallery

See also 
 History of Korea
 Korean independence movement
 Provisional Government of the Republic of Korea
 Korean Independence Military and Irregular Army Groups (1920s-1930s)
 Righteous army

References 

Armies in exile during World War II
Kim Won-bong
Korean independence movement
Military history of Korea
National liberation armies
Provisional Government of the Republic of Korea
World War II resistance movements
1940 establishments in China
1940 establishments in Korea
Kuomintang
China–South Korea military relations
South Korea–United States military relations